Ti-10V-2Fe-3Al (UNS designation R56410), also known as Ti 10-2-3, is a non-ferrous near-beta titanium alloy featuring an excellent combination of strength, ductility, fracture toughness and high cycle fatigue strength. It is typically used in the aerospace industry for critical aircraft structures, such as landing gear.

Ti-10V-2Fe-3Al Chemistry

Ti-10V-2Fe-3Al Markets
 Automobile

Ti-10V-2Fe-3Al Applications
 Airframe components
 Landing gear components

Ti-10V-2Fe-3Al Specifications
 AMS: 4983, 4984, 4986, 4987
 UNS: R56410

References

Titanium alloys